Pure Rock Fury is the fifth full-length album by American rock band Clutch, released on March 13, 2001, and is the only album release with Atlantic Records. The album liner notes state that it is dedicated to Ronnie True.

Album information 
This album features guest appearances by Scott "Wino" Weinrich (The Obsessed, Saint Vitus, Spirit Caravan), Leslie West (Mountain), and Dan and Joe of Sixty Watt Shaman, highlighting the band's habit of having musical contemporaries play on their albums.

The album yielded a minor hit with "Careful with That Mic...", a rap rock parody, which CMJ complimented for its clever rhymes. The song "Immortal" was originally released with different lyrics and arrangement as the song "Baby I'm Down" by Leslie West on his debut album Mountain. Clutch rearranged it and changed the lyrics somewhat, and it features a guitar solo by the original author, Leslie West, on it, who then had his band 'Mountain' cover this Clutch version on their Mystic Fire album the following year.

Clutch vocalist Neil Fallon has stated in an interview that of all Clutch's albums, Pure Rock Fury is his least favourite.

In popular culture 
The song "Immortal" is featured  in the video game Hitman: Contracts. The song "Pure Rock Fury" is featured in the video game MotorStorm: Pacific Rift.

Track listing
All songs written by Clutch except where noted.

Personnel 
 Neil Fallon – vocals, guitars on "Brazenhead", organ on "Careful With That Mic..."
 Tim Sult – guitar
 Dan Maines – bass
 Jean-Paul Gaster – drums
 Scott "Wino" Weinrich – guitar solo on "Red Horse Rainbow" (left channel), guitars on "Brazenhead"
 Heartbeat – congas on "Frankenstein" and "Brazenhead", additional vocals on "Brazenhead"
 Leslie West – guitars and additional vocals on "Immortal"
 Dan Kerzwyck (Sixty Watt Shaman) – additional vocals on "Sinkemlow"
 Joe Selby (Sixty Watt Shaman) – guitar solo on "Frankenstein" (right channel)
 Machine – additional vocals on "Careful With That Mic..."

Production 
 All songs produced by Lawrence "Uncle Punchy" Packer: "Open Up the Border" produced by Machine and Uncle Punchy "Careful with That Mic..." & "Drink to the Dead" produced by Machine  "Immortal" produced by Jason Corsaro & Leslie West
 All songs recorded by Larry Packer at Uncle Punchy Studios, Silverspring, MD except:  "Careful with That Mic..." recorded by Machine at IIWII, Weehawken, NJ, The Machine Shop, Hoboken, NJ and Uncle Punchy Studios "Immortal" recorded by Jason Corsaro at Show Place Studios, Dover, NJ
 All songs mixed by Jason Corsaro at Show Place Studios, Dover, NJ except:  "Careful with That Mic...", "Red Horse Rainbow" & "Drink to the Dead" mixed by Uncle Punchy
 All songs engineered by Ben Elliott and Assisted by Henry "Earthquake" Diaz, except:  "Careful with That Mic...", "Drink to the Dead" and "Spacegrass"
 Live portions of "Smoke Banshee", "Frankenstein" & "Brazenhead" recorded by Larry Packer at The 9:30 Club, Washington, D.C., September 2000  F.O.H. engineer: Shawn (Gus) Vitale
Monitor engineer: Chris Sherman
 All songs mastered by Larry Packer at Uncle Punchy Studios
 Executive producers: Neil Fallon, Jean-Paul Gaster, Dan Maines, Tim Sult

Chart positions
Albums

Singles

References

Clutch (band) albums
2001 albums
Atlantic Records albums
Albums produced by Machine (producer)